Tlahualilo is one of the 39 municipalities of Durango, in north-western Mexico. The municipal seat lies at Tlahualilo de Zaragoza. The municipality covers an area of 3,709.8 km².

As of 2010, the municipality had a total population of 22,244, up from 19,882 as of 2005. 

The municipality had 159 localities, the largest of which (with 2010 populations in parentheses) were: Tlahualilo de Zaragoza (9,517), El Lucero (Arcinas) (2,622), classified as urban, and San Francisco de Horizonte (Horizonte) (1,657), Jauja (1,101), Banco Nacional (1,072), and San Julio (1,046), classified as rural.

References

Municipalities of Durango